Kogan is a Russian spelling variant of the Jewish surname Cohen.

 Aleksandr Kogan — several people
 Artur Kogan (born 1974), Israeli chess master
 Belle Kogan (1902–2000), American industrial designer
 Boris Kogan (1940–1993), Russian-American chess master
 Dmitri Kogan (1978–2017), Russian violinist
 Herman Kogan (1914–1989), American journalist
 Igor Kogan (born 1969), Russian banker and investor. 
 Jacob Kogan (born 1995), young American actor
 Jonathan Kogan, member of the band Area 11
 Lazar Kogan (1889–1939), Soviet secret police functionary
 Leonid Kogan (1924–1982), Soviet violinist
 Michael Kogan (1920–1984), Russian businessman
 Pavel Kogan (disambiguation), several people 
 Richard Kogan (physician)
 Ruslan Kogan (born 1982), Belarusian-Australian entrepreneur, founder and director of Kogan Technologies
 Kogan.com, Australian retail and services group founded by Ruslan Kogan
 Yosif Arkadyevich Kogan, birth name of Osip Yermansky (1867-1941), Russian Menshevik economist
 Rita Kogan (born c.1976), Russian-born Israeli poet
 Valentina Kogan (born 1980), Argentine handball players

See also 
Cohn
Kagan (disambiguation)
Kaganovich (disambiguation)
Cohen (and its variations) as a surname
Y-chromosomal Aaron, the "Cohen" gene

Jewish surnames
Kohenitic surnames
Surnames of Russian origin
Yiddish-language surnames